The Ringgold Depot, on what is now U.S. Route 41 in Ringgold, Georgia, was listed on the National Register of Historic Places in 1978.

It is a  stone depot built as a station on the Western and Atlantic Railroad around 1850. Its  sandstone walls were damaged in the American Civil War, and repairs used limestone blocks.

References

National Register of Historic Places in Catoosa County, Georgia
Buildings and structures completed in 1850